Moray (or ) is a constituency of the Scottish Parliament (Holyrood) covering most of the council area of Moray. It elects one Member of the Scottish Parliament (MSP) by the first past the post method of election. It is also one of eight constituencies within the Highlands and Islands electoral region, which elects seven additional members, in addition to the eight constituency MSPs, to produce a form of proportional representation for the region as a whole.

The seat has been held since 2006 by Richard Lochhead of the Scottish National Party. Lochhead won the seat in a by-election held following death of the previous incumbent, Margaret Ewing of the SNP, from breast cancer.

Electoral region 

The Moray constituency is part of  the Highlands and Islands electoral region; the other seven constituencies are Argyll and Bute, Caithness, Sutherland and Ross, Inverness and Nairn, Na h-Eileanan an Iar, Orkney, Shetland and Skye, Lochaber and Badenoch.

The region covers most of Argyll and Bute council area, all of the Highland council area, most of the Moray council area, all of the Orkney Islands council area, all of the Shetland Islands council area and all of Na h-Eileanan Siar.

Constituency boundaries and council area 

The Moray constituency was created at the same time as the Scottish Parliament, in 1999, with the name and boundaries of an  existing Westminster constituency. In 2005, however, the Westminster (House of Commons) constituency was enlarged slightly.

The Holyrood constituency covers most of the Moray council area; the rest of the council area is covered by the Banffshire and Buchan Coast constituency, which is in the North East Scotland electoral region. The Moray Westminster constituency has covered the whole of the council area since 2005.

The electoral wards used in the creation of the Moray constituency are:

In full: Elgin City North, Elgin City South, Fochabers Lhanbryde, Forres, Heldon & Laich, Speyside Glenlivet
In part: Keith & Cullen (shared with Banffshire and Buchan Coast)

Member of the Scottish Parliament

Election results

2020s

2010s

1990s

Notes

External links

Constituencies of the Scottish Parliament
Politics of Moray
1999 establishments in Scotland
Constituencies established in 1999
Scottish Parliament constituencies and regions 1999–2011
Scottish Parliament constituencies and regions from 2011
Keith, Moray
Elgin, Moray
Dufftown
Forres
Lossiemouth